Frederick Speed (born 1909) was an English footballer. He was born in Newcastle upon Tyne, England.

Career
Speed joined Hull City from Newark Town in 1930. After making 49 appearances and scoring 15 goals in the league for Hull, he joined York City in 1934. He was the club's top scorer for the 1935–36 season with 13 goals. After making 83 appearances and scoring 16 goals for York, he joined Mansfield Town in 1936. He joined Exeter City in 1939 after making 100 appearances and scoring six goals in the league for Mansfield. He made two appearances in the league for Exeter.

References

1909 births
Year of death missing
Footballers from Newcastle upon Tyne
English footballers
Association football midfielders
Hull City A.F.C. players
York City F.C. players
Mansfield Town F.C. players
Exeter City F.C. players